Prof Pierre Sue FRSE (28 December 1739 – 28 March 1816) was a French anatomist, librarian and physician.

Life

He was born on 28 December 1739 the son of Jean-Joseph Sue and his wife, Jeanne Angelique Martin de Martin. His younger brother was Jean-Joseph Sue (1760-1830).

He qualified as a surgeon in 1763. In 1767 he became a Professor of Medicine in Paris. He was in this position through the French Revolution but in 1794 moved to the more sedate role of Librarian to the university.

In 1784 he was elected a Fellow of the Royal Society of Edinburgh. His proposers were Alexander Monro (secundus), Andrew Duncan, the elder and James Gregory.

He died on 28 March 1816.

Publications

Eloge de Louis (Elegy to Louis) (1792)
The History of Galvanism (1805)

References

French librarians
French surgeons
1816 deaths
18th-century French physicians
1739 births